The sport of tennis has been televised by the properties of ESPN since 1979.

Current tournaments and competitions covered by ESPN include Australian Open, The Championships, Wimbledon and the US Open. Non-Grand Slam events are no longer on ESPN.

Tournaments

Current
Australian Open (1984–present)
The Championships, Wimbledon (2012–present, full coverage, 2003–2011, partial coverage)
US Open (2015–present, full coverage, 2009–2014, partial coverage)

Former
French Open (1986–1993, 2002–2015; partial coverage)
Miami Open (1985–2007, 2011–2019)
Indian Wells Masters (?–2007, 2011–2021)
Atlanta Open (2010–2017)
Citi Open (2004–2017)
Silicon Valley Classic (2004–2017)
Canadian Open (2004–2017)
Winston-Salem Open (2004–2017)
ATP Finals (2000–2019)

Leagues
World TeamTennis (2014–2021)

ESPN Tennis announcers
James Blake (2020–present) (analyst)
Darren Cahill (2007–present) (analyst)
Mary Carillo (1988-1997, 2003-2010) (analyst)
Cliff Drysdale (1979–present) (play-by-play)
Chris Evert (2011–present) (analyst)
Mary Joe Fernandez (2000–present) (analyst)
Mardy Fish (2019) (analyst)
Chris Fowler (2003–present) (play-by-play)
Brad Gilbert (2004–present) (analyst)
Jason Goodall (2015–present) (play-by-play/analyst)
John McEnroe (2009–present) (analyst)
Patrick McEnroe (1995–present) (play-by-play)
Chris McKendry (2016–present) (studio host)
Tom Rinaldi (2003-2020) (reporter)
 Jeremy Schaap (2021–present) (reporter)
Alexandra Stevenson (2019–present) (analyst)
Rennae Stubbs (2017–present) (analyst)
Pam Shriver (1990–present) (analyst)

References

1970s American television series
1980s American television series
1990s American television series
2000s American television series
2010s American television series
2020s American television series
Sports telecast series
ESPN
1979 American television series debuts
ESPN original programming
ESPN2 original programming